Francesc Tosquelles (Reus, August 22, 1912 – Granges-sur-Lot, September 25, 1994), also known as François Tosquelles due to having lived in France for many years, was a Catalan psychiatrist. During the Spanish Civil War, he fought on the Republican side for the Workers' Party of Marxist Unification.  During World War II, he was the doctor at the psychiatric hospital of Saint-Alban-sur-Limagnole, Lozère, France. He is credited as one of the creators of institutional psychotherapy, an influential movement in the second half of the 20th century. His 1948 doctoral thesis for the University of Paris was titled 'The Psychopathology of Lived Experience' - "Part gestalt psychology, part phenomenology, part neurobiology, part psychoanalysis, it revived the Hippocratic notion of the medic–philosopher – ." After experiencing military occupations throughout his lifetime (German in France, Spanish in Catalonia, Francoist in Spain, and Stalinist in the Spanish communist parties), he concluded that "occupation" was not simply a historical reality but created a psychic structure in the individual, and that to achieve freedom, one must proceed by "disoccupation".

The Martinican doctor and later revolutionary activist Frantz Fanon was one of his students, who then used his techniques to some degree of success while living in Blida, Algeria, in the mid-1950s.

See also
 Francois-Tosquelles Hospital Center (fr)

References

 Patrick Faugeras: L'ombre portée de François Tosquelles, Erès, 2007, 

Physicians from Catalonia
Spanish psychiatrists
1912 births
1994 deaths
20th-century Spanish physicians